Ladkhed is a village in Darwha Taluka in Yavatmal District of Maharashtra state, India. It is a part of the Vidarbha region and is in Amravati Division. Its PIN code is 445201. and postal head office is Ladkhed.

Nearby cities
Ladkhed is surrounded by Ner Taluka towards the north, Yavatmal Taluka towards the east, Arni Taluka towards the south, and Digras Taluka towards the south. Wadgaon Road, Yavatmal, Ghatanji, and Mangrulpir.

Transport

By rail

Ladkhed Railway Station and Linga Railway Station are the very nearby railway stations to Ladkhed. Yavatmal Railway Station (near to Yavatmal), Darwha M Bgh Jn Railway Station (near to Darwha) are the railway stations reachable from nearby towns. Amravati Railway Station is major railway station 72 km near to Ladkhed.

By road
Darwha, Yavatmal are the nearby towns to Ladkhed having road connectivity to Ladkhed.

Education

Nearby colleges
College of Agriculture-Darwha
Mungsaji Maharaj Mahavidyalay, Darwha
Mungasaji Maharaj College Of Arts Commerce And Science

Schools
Allama Iqubal Urdu School
Vasant Naik Vidyalaya
Z. P. Urdu School
Z. P. Marathi School

References

Villages in Yavatmal district